Huangbeiping Township is a township of Zanhuang County in the Taihang Mountains of southwestern Hebei province, China, located about  from the border with Shanxi and  southwest of the county seat as the crow flies. , it has 27 villages under its administration.

See also
List of township-level divisions of Hebei

References

Township-level divisions of Hebei